Emma Bolger (born 5 January 1996 in Dublin) is an Irish actress who first gained notability as a child actress in the role of Ariel in the Jim Sheridan film In America.

Career 
At the age of seven, in 2002, Bolger became known for her role in Jim Sheridan's autobiographical movie In America, in which she starred with her older sister Sarah. Emma, having already won a part in the film, urged the director, Jim Sheridan, to take a look at her sister. She played Ariel, mischievous daughter of poor Irish immigrants who land in New York City in the 1980s.

For her role in the film Emma was awarded a Young Artist Award for Best Performance in a Feature Film – Young Actress Age Ten or Younger. and won Iowa Film Critics Award for Best Supporting Actress. She also received nominations for Chicago Film Critics Awards for Most Promising Performer, Broadcast Film Critics Association Awards for Best Young Actor/Actress, Gold Derby Film Awards for Breakthrough Performance,Satellite Awards for Actress in a Supporting Role, Drama,
and others. She was also nominated for Screen Actors Guild Award for Outstanding Performance by a Cast in a Motion Picture, with Laura Weinert writing that "Emma Bolger brings a startling freshness and lack of self-consciousness. We are continually surprised by the truth in her performance-she is never cloying, never too cute for the film's own good".. 
 
She later starred as title character in the 2005 film Heidi, based on  classic children's story, alongside Max Von Sydow as Grandfather and Diana Rigg as Grandmamma.  Bolger played Heidi, young orphan rejected by a cruel aunt and sent from the city to live with her grandfather in the Swiss Alps. Bolger went for an audition in London and few days later learned that she got part in the film. During the shooting of the film she was accompanied by her mother, Muriel, and a Welsh tutor. Andrea Beach in the review for Common Sense Media wrote that "Emma Bolger as Heidi is engaging and her performance is fine for someone so young". Stella Papamichael in her review for BBC called her performance "spirited".

She also had role in Colin Farrell crime comedy Intermission.

While her sister and co-star Sarah continued a successful acting career, Bolger gave up acting in favour of academic pursuits.

Filmography 
 2002: In America
 2003: Intermission
 2004: Proof (TV, 4 Episodes)
 2005: Heidi
 2006: The Snow Prince

Awards

Won
 Young Artist Award for Best Performance in a Feature Film – Young Actress Age Ten or Younger

Nominated
 Satellite Award for Best Supporting Actress - Motion Picture
 Chicago Film Critics Awards - Most Promising Performer
 9th Critics' Choice Awards - Best Child Performance
 BFCA Critics' Choice Award for Best Young Performer
 Phoenix Film Critics Society Award for Best Performance by a Youth in a Lead or Supporting Role – Female
 8th Golden Satellite Awards - Best Supporting Actress - Drama
 Screen Actors Guild Award for Outstanding Performance by a Cast in a Motion Picture along with Sarah Bolger, Paddy Considine, Djimon Hounsou & Samantha Morton

References

1996 births

Living people
21st-century Irish actresses
Actresses from Dublin (city)
Irish child actresses
Irish film actresses